Creeped Out is an anthology horror television series created by Bede Blake and Robert Butler as a co-production between CBBC Productions and DHX Media. It premiered in the United Kingdom on CBBC on 31 October 2017 (Halloween), and in Canada on the Family Channel on 5 October 2018. In the United States, the show was released as a Netflix original series.

Each episode has an individual story and all are linked together by 'The Curious', a mysterious story collector who appears at the beginning and end of each episode. According to the creators Bede Blake and Robert Butler, inspiration was drawn from Steven Spielberg and Amazing Stories in particular.

Format
Creeped Out is an anthology, with each episode featuring a new setting, story and new characters, although some details connect the stories together. This concept is quite similar to the American television show "Amazing Stories", in the sense that almost every episode, major details will shift and change. Each episode begins and ends with an appearance from The Curious (played by William Romain), a mysterious man whose face is always concealed by a mask. His self-stated purpose is to be a collecter of stories. The setting of Karter Bay appears in the episodes "Slapstick" and "The Call", and Zucco's Pizzeria is mentioned in "Trolled", "No Filter", "Marti" and "Kindlesticks".

Talking about The Curious, co-creator Bede Blake said: "It's designed to be an evolving urban legend. You don't know what's under that mask... Story-wise, he's not a threat to the children. He has his name because he is naturally curious. He's not somebody out to do harm. He's an observer."

Production
Creeped Out was first announced by the BBC on 28 March 2017, saying "the stories combine sci-fi, horror, adventure, suspense, fantasy and mystery to thrill young viewers."

Talking about the show for a Den of Geek interview, co-creator Robert Butler said that both CBBC and DHX gave the creators a long leash and "freedom to pitch whatever the hell we liked," but also provided buffers and steering when required.

According to Syfy Wire, this was a great plan, and said Blake and Butler's plan was to make Amazing Stories mixed in with The Twilight Zone, but aimed at a younger, modernized audience.

After the airing of "The Call", "Creeped Out" took a month-long hiatus. The first episode airing after the hiatus was "Bravery Badge".

On 9 August 2018, it was announced that "Creeped Out" had been commissioned for a second series by two channels, CBBC and Family Channel. The second series was released on 24 April 2019.

No third season has been announced as of 2021.

Episodes

Series 1 (2017–18)

Series 2 (2019)

Reception

Critical response 
The popular television magazine "TVTimes" gave the series four stars, comparing it to Tales of the Unexpected, and called it a "series of eerie and mysterious stories, ending with a moral."

Chris Bennion for The Times said, "the stories are pleasingly macabre and inventive." Den of Geek called the series "unmissable" and "brilliantly chilling."

Accolades 
Creeped Out won a BAFTA for Best Drama at the Children’s BAFTAS 2019. It has been nominated for numerous other awards, including the Royal Television Society North Award for Best Drama, and the Kidscreen Award for Best New Series. It has also been nominated for three Canadian Screen Awards 2020, including one for Best Youth Show. For writing it has been nominated for a Writers Guild Of Great Britain Award and a British Screenwriters Award. In the acting department it has been nominated for a Young Artist Award for Berkley Silverman, Young Entertainer Award for Jordan Poole, and Young Artists Awards for both Jordan Poole and Justin Kelly, who also won a Joey Award for his role in episode "Kindlesticks."

References

External links
 
 
 
  Creeped Out at DHX Media

2017 British television series debuts
2019 British television series endings
2010s British children's television series
BBC high definition shows
BBC television game shows
British children's horror television series
2010s British anthology television series
2010s Canadian anthology television series
BBC children's television shows
English-language television shows
Canadian children's science fiction television series
2010s Canadian science fiction television series
Television series by DHX Media
Television series by BBC Studios
Films scored by Joe Kraemer
CBBC shows